Sean Daniel Maitland (born 14 September 1988) is a New Zealand-born Scottish rugby union player. He plays for Saracens in the RFU Premiership. He previously played for London Irish and before that for Glasgow Warriors in the PRO12, Crusaders in Super Rugby and Canterbury in the Mitre 10 Cup. His regular playing positions are Wing and Full back.

Early life
Maitland was born in Tokoroa, New Zealand, on 14 September 1988. He attended Hamilton Boys' High School where he played in the first XV and competed in athletics, recording a personal best of 11.29 and 22.30 seconds for the 100m and 200m respectively, and threw the discus 45.47m. Maitland is half-Scottish and is of Samoan and Maori descent from his mother's side. He is the cousin of New Zealand born, Australian rugby union player Quade Cooper. Maitland and cousin Cooper also grew up with future Kiwi Rugby League international Isaac John.

Rugby career
Maitland spent 2005 and 2006 in the New Zealand Schools team and was a member of New Zealand under-19 World Cup winning side in 2007 and the New Zealand under-20 side in 2008 winning the IRB Junior World Championship. Sean scored four tries against teams from Argentina, Ireland and Wales.  One of his teammates was John Hardie who he would go on to play with in the Scotland Rugby Team.

Maitland debuted for Canterbury in 2006, and made his Super Rugby debut for the Crusaders against the ACT Brumbies in 2008 and played in every Crusaders match that year. In 2010, he was selected for the New Zealand Maori where he impressed, scoring a try against Ireland. On 11 March 2011 he scored four tries in a game against the Brumbies, equaling the record for the most tries scored in a Super Rugby match.
Maitland joined Glasgow Warriors in 2012, and won his first cap for Scotland at the start of the 2013 Six Nations Championship. After 3 years playing for Glasgow Warriors, Maitland moved to London Irish, and in 2016 to Saracens. During his time at Saracens he has won two Premiership titles in 2018 and 2019, scoring a try in the 2019 final. He also helped Saracens win the European Champions Cup in 2019, scoring a try in the final. He had previously missed Saracens' victory in the 2017 European Champions Cup final through injury.

On 30 April 2013, Maitland was announced in the British and Irish Lions squad for the tour of Australia later that year. The tour marked a possible first encounter with cousin Quade Cooper in the test arena, having played one another before at Super Rugby level. The two never met in-game as Cooper was controversially left out of the extended Wallaby squad for the series, and Maitland never took to the field in the one test that he was on the bench. Maitland was not selected in the team to play the Queensland Reds mid-week game, in which Cooper captained the Reds for the first time. The two would go on to play against each other in November 2013, when Scotland lost to Australia in the end-of-year-internationals

Maitland played in the Rugby World Cup 2015, in which Scotland reached the quarter-finals. He was controversially sin binned for a supposed deliberate knock-on in the quarter-finals. Scotland eventually went on to lose the match 35–34, ending their Rugby World Cup.

Personal life
Maitland qualifies for Scotland by his Glaswegian grandparents who emigrated to New Zealand in the 1960s. Maitland said "My granddad always reminded me that I was part Scottish and that I should never forget that."

On Maitland's maternal grandfather's side, Sean is also closely related to 'Smoking Joe' Stanley of New Zealand All Black fame in the mid 1980s–1990 on his Samoan side. 
In 2009, Maitland was a finalist in the Cleo New Zealand Bachelor of the Year competition.

In November 2013, Maitland and three other Scottish rugby players were charged with assault following an incident outside a Glasgow takeaway shop in August, although these were ultimately dropped and Maitland faced no further action.

In October 2020 Maitland was charged by the RFU for “conduct prejudicial to the interests of the Union” for breaking COVID-19 regulations whilst on duty with the Barbarians.

International tries

References

External links

1988 births
Living people
British & Irish Lions rugby union players from Scotland
Canterbury rugby union players
Crusaders (rugby union) players
Glasgow Warriors players
Māori All Blacks players
New Zealand expatriate sportspeople in Scotland
New Zealand sportspeople of Samoan descent
New Zealand people of Scottish descent
New Zealand rugby union players
Ngāpuhi people
People educated at Hamilton Boys' High School
Rugby union players from Tokoroa
Rugby union wings
Scotland international rugby union players
Stanley family (rugby)
London Irish players